George Bernard Cox FRIBA (31 July 1886 – 20 October 1978) was a British architect and co-founder of Harrison and Cox.

In 1912, he designed St Elizabeth's Church in Coventry and in 1925-26, he designed the sanctuary and side chapels for St Edward's Church, Selly Park, Birmingham.

He designed the Grade II listed pub, the Brookhill Tavern, at 484 Alum Rock Road, Alum Rock, Birmingham, built in 1927-28 for the Smethwick-based Mitchells & Butlers Brewery.

In the 1920s, he designed the Grade II listed Sacred Heart and St Margaret Mary Roman Catholic Church, Aston.

He designed the Village Hall in Tanworth-in-Arden, which opened in 1927.

Works

References

Architects from Staffordshire
1886 births
1978 deaths
Fellows of the Royal Institute of British Architects
People from Handsworth, West Midlands
Public house architects